Abu Mohammad Amin Uddin (known as A. M. Amin Uddin; born 29 September 1962) is a Bangladeshi lawyer, the 14th Attorney General of Bangladesh as well as President of the Bangladesh Supreme Court Bar Association Executive Committee 2020 - 2021 for the second consecutive term.

Background
Uddin was  born in Kulaura Upazila, Moulvibazar District in the then East Pakistan. He completed his HSC from Dhaka City College and bachelors from Dhaka University. He earned his LLB degree from Central Law College in 1982.

Career
Uddin started practicing as a lawyer on 26 October 1987. He was later enrolled in the High Court Division on 28 October 1989 and in the Appellate Division in 2003, both of the Supreme Court of Bangladesh. He has served as an Assistant Attorney General from 1996–2000 and Deputy Attorney General from 2000–2001.

Uddin served as the Secretary of the Bangladesh Supreme Court Bar Association Executive Committee 2006 - 2007.

Uddin was conferred the status of Senior Advocate in 2015.

References

1962 births
Living people
People from Moulvibazar District
Dhaka College alumni
Attorneys General of Bangladesh
20th-century Bangladeshi lawyers
21st-century Bangladeshi lawyers
Place of birth missing (living people)